Ozrenovići  is a village in the municipality of Goražde, Bosnia and Herzegovina.

Demographics 
According to the 2013 census, its population was 38.

References

Populated places in Goražde